The National Applications Office (NAO) was a  United States Department of Homeland Security program that provided local, state, and federal officials extensive access to spy-satellite imagery. It had access to military satellites to observe the United States.

Details
It has been described as a clearinghouse for requests by law enforcement, border security, and other domestic homeland security agencies to access feeds from spy satellites that have collected data for mainly scientific and military uses in the past. The name of the agency has been described as "deceptive."

Access to spy satellite surveillance tools allows Homeland Security and law enforcement officials to see real-time, high-quality images. This allows them to identify gang safehouses, border smuggler staging areas, or even hideouts of would-be terrorists. The spy surveillance satellites are considered by military experts to be far more powerful than those currently available to civilian officials. For example, they can take color photos, see through cloud cover and forest canopies, and use different parts of the light spectrum to locate traces left by chemical weapons. However, the full capabilities of these systems are among the most carefully held governmental secrets.

As of October 2, 2007, the United States Congress has filed an injunction against the NAO, that orders it not to begin operations. This is due largely to questions about civil liberty issues. Some in Congress wanted to shut down the agency because of concerns that the satellites could be used to create a "Big Brother" in the sky directed willy-nilly at anyone's house, place of worship or school.

The NAO's charter was signed in February 2008. On November 9, 2008, the Government Accountability Office released a recommendation that the NAO's role be more strictly defined. This might be seen as evidence that the aforementioned civil liberty issues have not been sufficiently addressed.

In 2009 Secretary of Homeland Security Janet Napolitano terminated the office.

References

External links 
 National Applications Office: Fact Sheet Department of Homeland Security, August 15, 2007
 U.S. Reconnaissance Satellites: Domestic Targets Documents Describe Use of Satellites in Support of Civil Agencies and Longstanding Controversy, National Security Archive, The George Washington University, April 11, 2008
 Satellite Surveillance: Domestic Issues, Congressional Research Service, March 21, 2008
 National Applications Office Charter
 Government Accountability Office Recommendations

United States Department of Homeland Security